Teregova is a commune in Caraș-Severin County, Western Romania with a population of 4388 people. It is composed of two villages, Rusca (Ruszka) and Teregova. It is situated in the historical region of Banat.

Natives
 Lajos Bebrits

See also
Ad Pannonios (castra)

References

Communes in Caraș-Severin County
Localities in Romanian Banat
Place names of Slavic origin in Romania